The Maritime Experiential Museum (Simplified Chinese: 海事博物馆及水族馆 (Maritime Museum and Aquarium)), formerly the Maritime Xperiential Museum and the Maritime Experiential Museum & Aquarium, was a museum in Resorts World Sentosa, Sentosa, Singapore, built to house the Jewel of Muscat. It was opened on 15 October 2011 and was closed on 2 March 2020 to become part of the new Singapore Oceanarium, an expansion of the former S.E.A. Aquarium.

Jewel of Muscat

The Jewel of Muscat is an accurate reproduction of the Arab dhow ship presented by the Sultanate of Oman to the government and people of Singapore after its arrival after recreating part of the Belitung ships's route from Oman to Indonesia.

See also
 Jewel of Muscat

References

External links

 Official site
 Website of the Jewel of Muscat

2011 establishments in Singapore
2020 disestablishments in Singapore
Maritime museums
Museums established in 2011
Museums disestablished in 2020
Museums in Singapore
Defunct museums
Omani culture